Velarifictorus is a genus of crickets in the family Gryllidae and tribe Gryllini. Species have been recorded in Australia, Asia, Africa and the southeastern US.

Species 
Velarifictorus includes the following species:

Subgenus unassigned
Velarifictorus gayandi Otte & Alexander, 1983
Velarifictorus kittana Otte & Alexander, 1983
Velarifictorus nullaga Otte & Alexander, 1983
Velarifictorus scutellatus Chopard, 1951
Velarifictorus urunga Otte & Alexander, 1983

Subgenus Buangina Otte & Alexander, 1983
Velarifictorus anemba Otte & Alexander, 1983
Velarifictorus bogabilla Otte & Alexander, 1983
Velarifictorus caribonga Otte & Alexander, 1983
Velarifictorus diminuens Walker, 1869
Velarifictorus dummala Otte & Alexander, 1983
Velarifictorus fistulator Saussure, 1877
Velarifictorus illalonga Otte & Alexander, 1983
Velarifictorus mediocris Mjoberg, 1913
Velarifictorus pikiara Otte & Alexander, 1983
Velarifictorus woomera Otte & Alexander, 1983

Subgenus Pseudocoiblemmus Gorochov, 2001
Velarifictorus brevifrons Gorochov, 2001
Velarifictorus longifrons Chopard, 1969

Subgenus Velarifictorus Randell, 1964
Velarifictorus acutilobus Ingrisch, 1998
Velarifictorus affinis Chopard, 1948
Velarifictorus albipalpis Chopard, 1969
Velarifictorus amani Otte & Cade, 1983
Velarifictorus andamanensis Bhowmik, 1967
Velarifictorus angustus Ingrisch, 1998
Velarifictorus aspersus Walker, 1869
Velarifictorus bannaensis Zhang, Liu & Shi, 2017
Velarifictorus basui Bhowmik, 1985
Velarifictorus beybienkoi Gorochov, 1985
Velarifictorus bicornis Ingrisch, 1998
Velarifictorus bolivari Uvarov, 1912
Velarifictorus bos Gorochov, 1992
Velarifictorus botswanus Otte, Toms & Cade, 1988
Velarifictorus brunneri Chopard, 1969
Velarifictorus bubalus Gorochov, 1992
Velarifictorus bulbosus Ingrisch, 1998
Velarifictorus burri Chopard, 1962
Velarifictorus ceylonicus Chopard, 1928
Velarifictorus changus Otte, 1987
Velarifictorus chobei Otte, Toms & Cade, 1988
Velarifictorus confinius Ingrisch, 1998
Velarifictorus cuon Gorochov, 2001
Velarifictorus dedzai Otte, 1987
Velarifictorus elephas Gorochov, 1992
Velarifictorus fallax Chopard, 1969
Velarifictorus flavifrons Chopard, 1966
Velarifictorus ghanzicus Otte, 1987
Velarifictorus gradifrons Ingrisch, 1998
Velarifictorus grylloides Chopard, 1969
Velarifictorus hemelytrus Saussure, 1877
Velarifictorus hiulcus Karsch, 1893
Velarifictorus horridus Ingrisch, 1998
Velarifictorus jharnae Bhowmik, 1967
Velarifictorus kasungu Otte, 1987
Velarifictorus katangensis Sjöstedt, 1917
Velarifictorus khasiensis Vasanth, Lahiri, Biswas & Ghosh, 1975
Velarifictorus koshunensis Shiraki, 1911
Velarifictorus landrevus Ma, Qiao & Zhang, 2019
Velarifictorus lambai Bhowmik, 1985
Velarifictorus latithorax Chopard, 1928
Velarifictorus lengwe Otte, 1987
Velarifictorus leonidi Gorochov, 2001
Velarifictorus lepesmei Chopard, 1961
Velarifictorus lesnei Chopard, 1935
Velarifictorus maindroni Chopard, 1969
Velarifictorus matuga Otte & Cade, 1983
Velarifictorus micado (Saussure, 1877) – type species (as Scapsipedus micado Saussure)
Velarifictorus minoculus Ingrisch, 1998
Velarifictorus modicoides Ingrisch, 1998
Velarifictorus mosambicus Chopard, 1962
Velarifictorus natus Otte, Toms & Cade, 1988
Velarifictorus neavei Sjöstedt, 1917
Velarifictorus nepalicus Bey-Bienko, 1968
Velarifictorus nigrifrons Brunner von Wattenwyl, 1893
Velarifictorus nigrithorax Chopard, 1962
Velarifictorus novaeguineae Gorochov, 1988
Velarifictorus nyasa Otte, 1987
Velarifictorus obniger Otte & Cade, 1983
Velarifictorus okavangus Otte, Toms & Cade, 1988
Velarifictorus parvus Chopard, 1928
Velarifictorus politus Ichikawa, 2001
Velarifictorus problematicus Gorochov, 1996
Velarifictorus pui Ingrisch, 1998
Velarifictorus rectus Ingrisch, 1998
Velarifictorus rhombifer Chopard, 1954
Velarifictorus ryukyuensis Oshiro, 1990
Velarifictorus sahyadrensis Vasanth, 1991
Velarifictorus saussurei Chopard, 1969
Velarifictorus shillongensis Vasanth, 1993
Velarifictorus shimba Otte & Cade, 1983
Velarifictorus similis Chopard, 1938
Velarifictorus simillimus Chopard, 1938
Velarifictorus spinosus Ingrisch, 1998
Velarifictorus sukhadae Bhowmik, 1967
Velarifictorus sulcifrons Ingrisch, 1998
Velarifictorus sus Gorochov, 1992
Velarifictorus temburongensis Tan, Ingrisch & Wahab, 2017
Velarifictorus tenepalpus Ingrisch, 1998
Velarifictorus transversus Chopard, 1938
Velarifictorus triangularis Ingrisch, 1998
Velarifictorus vicinus Chopard, 1955
Velarifictorus vietnamensis Gorochov, 2001
Velarifictorus viphius Otte, 1987
Velarifictorus vittifrons Sjöstedt, 1917
Velarifictorus whelleni Chopard, 1954

References

External links
 
 

Ensifera genera
Gryllinae
Orthoptera of Africa
Orthoptera of Asia